The Canon EOS DCS 5 was Kodak's first Canon-based Digital SLR camera (a rebranded Kodak EOS DCS-5). It was released in March 1995. Like that camera, it combined an EOS-1N body with a modified Kodak digital back. The sensor had a size of 13.8 mm x 9.2 mm, which gives a factor of 2.6.

There were three different versions of this camera: 5c with color sensor, 5m with monochrome sensor, and 5IR with infrared sensor. It had an built-in microphone, to record verbal information for the images. A burst up to 10 images in 4 seconds was possible. The price was $11,995.

See also
Kodak DCS

References

External links
 Kodak EOS DCS 5

Canon EOS DSLR cameras
Kodak DCS cameras